Guru Sishyulu is a 1981 Telugu-language comedy film, produced by C. Ashwini Dutt under the Vyjayanthi Movies banner and directed by K. Bapayya. It stars Akkineni Nageswara Rao, Krishna, Sridevi and Sujatha, with music composed by K. V. Mahadevan.

Plot
The film begins with Zamindar Gajapathi Rao fixing his younger brother Bhujangam's alliance with his love Suguna which is denied by Gajapathi Rao's wife Parvathi due to the promiscuous nature of Suguna. So, Bhujagam a vicious person intrigues Gajapathi Rao in the murder offense of Suguna's brother Balaram. In the court, he forcibly makes Parvathi lie that she has illicit relations with Balaram which leads to Gajapathi Rao's death. After that, pregnant Parvathi knows the evil trap of Bhujangam and tries to commit suicide when a compounder Veeraraju protects her. Time passes, and Parvathi gives birth to twins when a millionaire Raj Gopal's wife Meenakshi goes into miscarriage to save her Veeraraju handovers elder one Kalyan to him. Thereafter, Parvathi disappears, leaving the younger one Gopi's responsibility to Veeraraju. After some time, Raj Gopal has one more child Kamal even Veeraraju is also blessed with a baby girl Shanti.

Years roll by, and Kalyan a good-nurtured person who enjoys life in the frolic returns from abroad. Meanwhile, Gopi, a naughty guy, always stands for piety. Shanti takes household responsibility and always seeks Gopi to take up a job. At present, Bhujangam is a huge gangster, and his son Raja nets the beautiful girls. On the occasion of Kalyan's arrival, a party is organized in a hotel where Shanti works and she dislikes his flirting behavior of Kalyan but he admires her. On the other side, Kamal a spoiled brat makes a heinous eye on a staff girl Prema and traps her as Kalyan. Being aware of it, Shanti's hatred increases, so when Kalyan proposes she turndowns, nevertheless, he decides to marry her.

Parallelly, Meenakshi's brother Pachalla Picheswrara Rao wants to couple up his daughter Latha with Kalyan and asks him to send a photograph to her. At the same time, Gopi applies for a job in Kalyan's company with his photograph, fortuitously, which is sent to Latha and she falls for him. Once Suguna witnesses Parvathi when she goes through an accident, Kalyan joins her in the hospital where she notices Veeraraju and hiddenly views Gopi. Apart from that, Kamal is also involved in the crime line too with another gangster Seshu. In the meantime, Latha arrives and meets Gopi but he runs away looking at her. Picheswara Rao blames Kalyan for the deed then he recollects the mistake. Fortunately, Kalyan makes acquaintance with Gopi and both of them play a confusing drama. After a few comic incidents, Latha learns the truth but understands the true love of Gopi. Eventually, Veeraraju greets Meenakshi, and both of them make conversation regarding the past which Kamal overhears and hits his mother then she claims Kalyan as her own so Kamal leaves the house.

Hereafter, Kalyan moves Gopi about his marriage proposal with Shanti which she denounces for cheating on Prema when Kalyan and Gopi start digging out the matter. During that time, Kamal makes a business deal with both Seshu and Bhujangam but double-crosses' them and hides the treasure. Eventually, Kalyan and Gopi catch him and performs his marriage with Prema. Hereabouts, Shanti realizes her mistake and starts loving Kalyan. Veeraraju too reveals the birth secret of Kalyan and Gopi when the brothers unite. Now, a dead heat situation occurs, Seshu kidnaps Kamal, and Bhujangam kidnaps Shanti and gives a call for Kalyan and Gopi respectively; for the treasure. Simultaneously, Parvathi spots Bhujangam's men seizing Gopi, so she follows them but is caught. At last, Kalyan and Gopi make a play, cease the baddies and protect their men. Finally, the movie ends on a happy note with the marriages of Kalyan with Shanti and Gopi with Latha.

Cast

Crew
Art: G. V. Subba Rao
Choreography: N. Srinivas
Fights: Sambasiva Rao
Dialogues: Jandhyala
Lyrics: Acharya Aatreya
Playback:S. P. Balasubrahmanyam, P. Susheela,
Music: K. V. Mahadevan
Story: V. C. Guhanathan
Editing: Gautham Raju
Cinematography: P. L. Roy
Producer: C. Ashwini Dutt
Screenplay - Director: K. Bapayya   
Banner: Vyjayanthi Movies
Release Date: 21 March 1981

Soundtrack

Music was composed by K. V. Mahadevan. Lyrics were written by Acharya Aatreya.

References

External links
 

Indian comedy films
Films directed by K. Bapayya
Films scored by K. V. Mahadevan
1980s Telugu-language films
1981 comedy films
1981 films